Mario Perelli was an Argentine actor. He starred in the 1950 film Arroz con leche under director Carlos Schlieper.

References

External links
 
 

Argentine male film actors